Football at the DPR Korea Championships (Chosŏn'gŭl: 공화국선수권대회 축구; Hanja: 共和國選手權大會 蹴球) is a football knockout cup competition in North Korea. The competition is a part of the multi-sport event – DPR Korea Championship. This competition is commonly known as a Republic Championship.

History 
The championship was launched in October, 1972. This championship was held from September through October. Initially held every autumn, after 2007 it was held only every other year.

Champions

Men 
1972-2000: unknown
2001: April 25 (P'yŏngyang)
2002–03: unknown
2004:Pyongyang (P'yŏngyang)
2005: unknown
2006: April 25
2007: Amnokgang
2009: Kyonggongopsong (Ministry of Light Industry) (P'yŏngyang)
2011: April 25
2013:
2015:
2017:
2019: Ryomyong

Women 
2019: My Hometown Girl WFC

References

External links
 North Korea – List of Champions at RSSSF

Football competitions in North Korea